Ickworth is a small civil parish, almost coextensive with the estate of the National Trust's Ickworth House, in the West Suffolk district of Suffolk, eastern England,  south-west of Bury St Edmunds. The population of the parish was only minimal at the 2011 Census and is included in the civil parish of Lawshall.

Landmarks
Ickworth has three main clusters of the 12 listed structures in the Grade II* listed park and garden which are: 

The main park also had the only vineyard on National Trust land, until 2015 when it was grubbed up to allow the walled garden to be reinstated.  An orchard of historic fruit trees was planted as the first stage of this plan.

History

Early history
Mentioned in the Domesday Book of 1086 as having 12 heads of household (nine of which villagers (villeins), three as smallholders) and four tied serfs (slaves), Ickworth rendered £3 and a small vill-tax to its overlords and was valued as being worth £4 per year.

Modern history
Samuel Lewis's overview of 1848 reads:

The bulk of the land formed Lord Bristol's main freehold estate which was sold for public benefit to the National Trust to pay the precursor to inheritance tax in 1956.

In 2005 its population was estimated at 30.

Demography
The 2011 census does not provide a population (see above) although Ickworth is part of the west of Census Output Area E00153548, which had 275 inhabitants of which 185 lived in a detached dwelling, 16 lived in a purpose-built block of flats or tenement, five in part of a converted or bed-sit and one in a commercial building.

Transport

To the east is the A143 which is linked to the A14 by the shortest route via a turning onto a minor straight road in Horringer, Westley Lane, immediately to the north.  The A14 is a main East-West route in England which then leads west to:
The A11, its south spur onto the M11
The M11 at Cambridge 
The A1 at Huntingdon
The M1/M6 junction at Swinford, Leicestershire

References

External links

Neighbouring substantive village website: Horringer

Villages in Suffolk
Civil parishes in Suffolk
Borough of St Edmundsbury